The CN 90 F4 also marketed under the name of Super 90 is a French rifled 90 mm tank gun produced by Giat Industries .

Additional specifications 

Overall length: 5.74 m
Barrel length: 4.68 m
Rifling length: 4.022 m
Rifling twist: 25°
Number of grooves: 60
Muzzle brake: single baffle 
Maximum recoil length: 550 mm
Maximum service chamber pressure: 210 MPa
Overall weight:  602 kg (with armored gun shield)
Recoiling gun mass: 422 kg

Current operators

See also
CN 90 F2
CN 90 F3

References

Cold War artillery of France
Tank guns of France
90 mm artillery